The textile block system is a unique structural building method created by Frank Lloyd Wright in the early 1920s.  While the details changed over time, the basic concept involves patterned concrete blocks reinforced by steel rods, created by pouring concrete mixture into molds, thus enabling the repetition of form.  The blocks are then stacked to build walls.

Wright's textile block houses are:

Ennis House
Robert and Rae Levin House (check also the other Michigan - Galesburg and Parkwin/Kalamazoo - houses at List of Frank Lloyd Wright works)
Millard House
Samuel Freeman House
Storer House (Los Angeles)
Westhope, located in Tulsa, Oklahoma, Wright's only Textile Block house outside of California.

References

Frank Lloyd Wright